Alberto Antônio de Paula (born 31 May 1987 in Guarulhos), or simply Beto, is a Brazilian footballer who plays as a striker for Vitória-ES.

Club career
Beto was chosen the best young player of the year by the Paulista Soccer Association in 2005.

On 17 December 2009, he transferred to Nanchang Bayi. Beto made his China Super League debut on 27 March 2010,in a 0–2 away loss to Beijing Guoan. He scored his goal for Nanchang on his fourth appearance, in a 3–2 home win over Hangzhou Greentown on 17 April.

On 23 March 2011, Beto signed a three-month contract with China League One club Shenzhen Phoenix. He made only 7 appearances for Shenzhen and scored a goal on 4 May in a FA Cup match which Shenzhen beat Shenyang Dongjin 3–0 at home. He left the club after his contract was expired in June 2011.

In 2012, Beto joined Brazilian outfit Penapolense.

On 4 January 2017, Beto signed for Lebanese Premier League club Ansar; he scored one goal, against Nejmeh in the Beirut derby, in seven games.

In 2018 he signed for Deportivo Municipal and promised many goals, in just a week he is almost an idol for the fans, who named him "Betinho" or "Beto". In the preseason proved to be one of the best, it is said that received offers of Santos F.C. and New York City F.C. but rejected them due to the affection he has for Peru and especially for the fans of the dump.

International career
Beto has been capped at Under-18 and Under-20 level for Brazil.

Honours

Wisła Kraków 
 Ekstraklasa: 2008–09

International 
 Copa Sendai: 2005

Individual 
 Best young player of the year by A.P.F.: 2005

Statistics 
 (correct as of 21 April 2013)

References

External links

 
 

1987 births
Living people
People from Guarulhos
Brazilian footballers
Brazilian expatriate footballers
Sociedade Esportiva Palmeiras players
Ituano FC players
Associação Atlética Ponte Preta players
Clube Atlético Juventus players
América Futebol Clube (SP) players
Clube Atlético Bragantino players
Wisła Kraków players
Shanghai Shenxin F.C. players
Clube Atlético Penapolense players
Clube Atlético Hermann Aichinger players
ABC Futebol Clube players
Avaí FC players
Al Ansar FC players
Grêmio Novorizontino players
Botafogo Futebol Clube (PB) players
Madura United F.C. players
Perseru Serui players
Badak Lampung F.C. players
Esporte Clube Noroeste players
Vitória Futebol Clube (ES) players
Liga 1 (Indonesia) players
Chinese Super League players
China League One players
Campeonato Brasileiro Série B players
Campeonato Brasileiro Série C players
Ekstraklasa players
Lebanese Premier League players
Association football forwards
Brazilian expatriate sportspeople in China
Brazilian expatriate sportspeople in Poland
Brazilian expatriate sportspeople in Lebanon
Brazilian expatriate sportspeople in Kuwait
Brazilian expatriate sportspeople in Indonesia
Expatriate footballers in China
Expatriate footballers in Poland
Expatriate footballers in Lebanon
Expatriate footballers in Kuwait
Expatriate footballers in Indonesia
Al Jahra SC players
Kuwait Premier League players
Footballers from São Paulo (state)